A mayfly is a type of insect belonging to the order Ephemeroptera.

Mayfly or Mayflies may also refer to:
 Mayfly (film), a 2008 short film
 Mayflies (TV series), a 2022 two-part television drama
 Mayfly (band), an American Christian metal band from Ohio
 HMA No. 1 or Mayfly, a British Royal Navy airship 
 HMS Mayfly, a list of British Royal Navy ships
 Mayfly, an album by Cy Curnin
 "Mayfly", a song by Belle and Sebastian from If You're Feeling Sinister
 Bland Mayfly, an early aircraft constructed in 1910 by Lilian E. Bland 
 Halton Mayfly, a British two-seat biplane designed by C.H. Latimer-Needham in the 1920s
 Southend MPG Mayfly, a British two-seat human-powered aircraft, built in the 1960s
 The Mayflies USA, an American power pop band

Animal common name disambiguation pages